Thomas Stevenson (6 June 1804 – 1845) was an English first-class cricketer who played for Cambridge University in one match in 1822, totalling 18 runs with a highest score of 13.

Stevenson was educated at Eton College and Trinity College, Cambridge. After graduating he became a Church of England priest and was rector of St Peter's Church, Chesil, Winchester, 1832–44.

References

Bibliography
 

1804 births
1845 deaths
English cricketers
English cricketers of 1787 to 1825
Cambridge University cricketers
People educated at Eton College
Alumni of Trinity College, Cambridge
Church of England priests